William Ralph Shockley (December 4, 1918 – March 31, 1945) was a United States Army soldier and a recipient of the United States military's highest decoration—the Medal of Honor—for his actions in World War II.

Biography
He was born December 4, 1918, in Bokoshe, Oklahoma and enlisted in the Army from Selma, California. By March 31, 1945, he was serving as a private first class in Company L, 128th Infantry Regiment, 32nd Infantry Division. During a Japanese counterattack on that day, on the Villa Verde Trail in Luzon, the Philippines, he voluntarily stayed behind and provided covering fire while the rest of his unit retreated. Shockley was killed by the advancing Japanese soldiers. He was posthumously awarded the Medal of Honor seven months later, on October 19, 1945.

Shockley, aged 26 at his death, was buried in Floral Memorial Cemetery, Selma, California.

Medal of Honor citation
Private First Class Shockley's official Medal of Honor citation reads:

See also

List of Medal of Honor recipients
List of Medal of Honor recipients for World War II

References

1918 births
1945 deaths
People from Le Flore County, Oklahoma
United States Army personnel killed in World War II
United States Army Medal of Honor recipients
People from Selma, California
United States Army soldiers
World War II recipients of the Medal of Honor